Rye is an unincorporated community and census-designated place (CDP) in Gila County, Arizona, United States. As of the 2010 census, it had a population of 77.

Demographics

References

Census-designated places in Gila County, Arizona